Responsible Research Pte Ltd is an independent Environmental Social and Corporate Governance (ESG) research firm for global institutional asset owners and asset managers. Based in Singapore, Responsible Research analyses the ESG factors and regulatory landscapes that increasingly threaten portfolio returns in Asian markets.

Many signatories to the UN Principles for Responsible Investment (PRI) believe that ESG risks and opportunities are not adequately covered by traditional investment research. Responsible Research partners with PRI signatories and asset managers to analyse the trends of ESG practices, and the impact of disclosure on Socially Responsible Investment portfolios in Asia.

Operations 
Lucy Carmody, executive director of Responsible Research, founded Responsible Research as a private limited company in Singapore in 2008. The company is overseen by a Board of ten directors committed to sustainable business development. All research is conducted by an international team of responsible investment analysts from an eco-office in Wessex Estate near Singapore’s new hub of biotechnology, digital media, and academia.

Research and publications 
Responsible Research provides a range of studies that highlight the ESG consequences for institutional investors in Asia. They research and publish sector reports, thematic reports, company briefings on sustainability, “IPO Watch”, and “Asia Uncovered- ESG Newsletter”.

The sector and thematic reports analyse the socio-political and regulatory context of Asian business trends, consider case studies of ESG leaders and laggards, and offer projections on the investment risks and opportunities related to the corporate social responsibility, environmental sustainability, and governance of Asia’s leading companies.

Past reports in Responsible Research "Issues for Responsible Investors" series include: Feeding Asia, Waste in Asia, Microfinance in India, Water in India, Telecoms in Asia, Hong Kong Real Estate, Palm Oil in Asia, Forestry in Asia, Beverages in Asia, Pharma and Healthcare in Asia, Airlines in Asia, Green Building in Asia, Water in China, Powering Asia, Sustainable Stock Exchanges, and Sustainability in Asia.  In 2011, the company will also publish Nuclear in Asia, Impact Investment, Alternative Energy in Asia, Banking in Asia, Mining in Asia, Automobiles in Asia, and the Future of Fish.

The company newsletter “Asia Uncovered – ESG Newsletter” provides reactions and insights about news and political or economic developments as they pertain to sustainable investment in Asia.

Methodology 
The company’s research methodology is founded on two proprietary tools modelled to track material ESG goals in Asia: the Asian Sustainability Rating (TM) and RepRisk®.

The Asian Sustainability Rating(ASR) is an ESG benchmarking tool that monitors sustainability progress and ESG management across a sector. Responsible Research analysts score companies based on public information for ESG benchmarks to rank Asian companies against regional peers and global leaders.

Responsible Research is also the exclusive partner in Asia to deliver RepRisk®. This tool is based on global media sources and independent third parties in Chinese, English, French, German, Japanese, Korean, Portuguese, Russian and Spanish. The RepRisk Index is an indicator of a company or project’s exposure to controversial issues and allows for an assessment of risks along investments and business relationships. RepRisk® enables investment bankers, asset managers, and supply chain managers to implement effective screening procedures for environmental and social issues before they inflict financial or reputational damage.

Engagement 
Responsible Research also offers consultancy services through engagement advisory services, commissioned reports, exclusions screening, and portfolio screening for ESG factors.

Where appropriate, Responsible Research develops relationships between investors with common interests to form collaborative engagement initiatives. Lucy Carmody writes and speaks on opportunities for engagement to improve ESG disclosure with stock exchanges, regulators, investors, and NGOs.

Global clients of Responsible Research include ADM Capital, APG Group, Arisaig Partners, AVIVA, First State Investments (CFSGAM), Dragon Capital, Lend Lease, Hermes EOS, Treasure Asia Asset Management, and Willow Tree Impact Investors.

Responsible Research also partners with United Nations Conference on Trade and Development on their Sustainable Stock Exchanges initiative and Emerging Market Disclosure Project through the PRI. Under the UN Emerging Market Disclosure Project, Responsible Research collaborated with a global team of ESG research providers to develop a scorecard for measuring disclosure in South Korean companies and increasing engagement efforts among local stakeholders.

As a founding member of the Asian Association of Independent Research Providers (AsiaIRP), Responsible Research supports efforts to raise awareness of independent investment research as a more responsible alternative to traditional investment banking analysis.

In order to provide independent and conflict-free analysis, Responsible Research derives revenue from investors and fund managers, not from companies that are the subject of their research. To preserve the impartiality of their analysis, Responsible Research does not accept commissions from Asian listed companies, governments, or regulators.

References

External links
 https://web.archive.org/web/20110904122418/http://www.asiairp.com/ABOUT-US.html

Service companies of Singapore